Cherry Point is an unincorporated community in northern Alberta in Clear Hills County, located  south of Highway 64,  northwest of Grande Prairie.

Localities in Clear Hills County